"Don't Want You Back" is a song by British singer Ellie Campbell. The song was released in October 2000 as the third single from her debut studio album, Ellie (2001). The song peaked at number 50 on the UK Singles Chart.

Track listing
European single (9201302)
 "Don't Want You Back"  (radio edit)  - 3:20
 "Don't Want You Back"  (Danja-Mouse remix) - 2:48
 "Don't Want You Back"  (W.I.P. remix - edit) - 2:48
 "Don't Want You Back"  (Enhanced video) - 4:32

Australian single
 "Don't Want You Back"  (radio edit)  - 3:20
 "Don't Want You Back"  (W.I.P. remix) - 4:33
 "Message from Ellie" - 0:17
 "Album Sampler"  (Excerpts from: "You're No Good", "So Many Ways" and "Sweet Lies")

Charts

References

2000 singles
2000 songs
Songs written by Mark Topham
Songs written by Karl Twigg
Jive Records singles
Dance-pop songs
Songs written by Pete Waterman